André Corvington (19 November 1877 – 13 December 1918) was a Haitian fencer. He competed in the individual foil event at the 1900 Summer Olympics. He was killed in action fighting for the French during World War I.

See also
 List of Olympians killed in World War I

References

External links
 

1877 births
1918 deaths
Haitian male foil fencers
Olympic fencers of Haiti
Fencers at the 1900 Summer Olympics
People from Les Cayes
French military personnel killed in World War I
Haitian emigrants to France